Sandtown is an unincorporated community located in Neshoba County, Mississippi, United States.

References

 Unincorporated communities in Neshoba County, Mississippi
 Unincorporated communities in Mississippi